Anna Yuryevna Netrebko (born 18 September 1971) is a Russian-Austrian operatic soprano with an active international career and performed prominently at the Salzburg Festival, Metropolitan Opera, Vienna State Opera, and The Royal Opera.

Discovered and promoted by Valery Gergiev, she began her career at the Mariinsky Theatre, collaborating with the conductor in the theater and performances elsewhere. She was noticed globally after playing Donna Anna in Mozart's Don Giovanni at the 2002 Salzburg Festival. She had been known for her rendition of lyric and coloratura soprano roles but proceeded into heavier 19th-century romantic roles, such as Leonora in Il trovatore and the role of Lady Macbeth in Macbeth. Since 2016, she has turned her focus to verismo repertoire. In 2015 she married Azerbaijani tenor Yusif Eyvazov, with whom she has been performing frequently since.

She has been an exclusive artist for Deutsche Grammophon since 2002. She has won multiple Echo Klassik Awards, and was included on the  Time 100 list in 2007. She was named a People's Artist of Russia in 2008, and an Austrian Kammersängerin in 2017.

Early life and training
Netrebko was born in Krasnodar, in a family of Kuban Cossack background. While studying at the Saint Petersburg Conservatory, Netrebko worked as a janitor at Saint Petersburg's Mariinsky Theatre. Later when she auditioned for the theatre, conductor Valery Gergiev, recognizing her from her prior work, subsequently became her vocal mentor.

Career

Early career (1994–2001)

Under Gergiev's guidance, in 1994, Netrebko made her operatic stage debut at the Mariinsky at age 22 as Susanna in The Marriage of Figaro despite initially being billed as Barbarina. In the same year, she also performed as the Queen of the Night in The Magic Flute with the Riga Independent Opera Avangarda Akadēmija under conductor David Milnes. She subsequently became associated with the Mariinsky Theatre.

In autumn 1995, Netrebko made her American debut with Lyudmila at the San Francisco Opera. Following this successful performance, she was enrolled in the Merola Opera Program in summer 1996 and became a frequent guest singer in San Francisco in the next seasons, performing in L'elisir d'amore (Adina), Betrothal in a Monastery, Idomeneo (Ilia), La bohème (Musetta), The Tsar's Bride (Marfa), Don Giovanni (Zerlina), Falstaff (Nannetta). In 1998, she performed Lyudmila when the Mariinsky production of the opera was presented at the Metropolitan Opera House, and made Salzburg Festival debut in Parsifal conducted by Gergiev. She sang her first Violetta in Verdi's La traviata in the same year in Saint Petersburg, and her first Amina in La sonnambula the following year. In October 1999, she performed Gilda in Rigoletto at the Washington National Opera.

Rise to fame (2002–2010)
Netrebko made her debut with the Metropolitan Opera company in February 2002, as Natasha in the Met premiere of Prokofiev's War and Peace, and performed as Giulietta in I Capuleti e i Montecchi at the Opera Company of Philadelphia. Her international breakthrough came in August 2002, when she sang Donna Anna in Don Giovanni conducted by Nikolaus Harnoncourt at the Salzburg Festival, where she would be particularly associated. In September 2002, she returned to the Royal Opera for Servilia in La clemenza di Tito, and in next two seasons for Don Giovanni and Rigoletto. She then returned to Washington National Opera for Ilia in Idomeneo. In 2003, she made her Vienna State Opera and Bavarian State Opera debuts, both with Violetta in La traviata. In November 2003, she made her Los Angeles Opera debut with Lucia di Lammermoor, and would return in 2005 for Roméo et Juliette and in 2006 for Manon.

In February 2004, she returned to Vienna for Don Giovanni, and was subsequently invited as the guest performer at the Vienna Opera Ball, where she returned in 2007. She then starred in a Japan tour of La bohème in Robert Carsen's staging as Musetta conducted by Seiji Ozawa, and subsequently returned to San Francisco Opera in the same role. After withdrawing from two engagements, citing exhaustion, she returned to scene in November in Metropolitan Opera's La bohème as Musetta. In summer 2005, she starred in the premiere of Willy Decker's new staging of La traviata in Salzburg, conducted by Carlo Rizzi. In December 2005, she sang Gilda in Rigoletto at the Metropolitan Opera, and was featured in the premiere of Otto Schenk's new production of Don Pasquale and Japan tour of Don Giovanni in the same season.

In 2006 she sang Susanna in the new Claus Guth production of The Marriage of Figaro in Salzburg.

She sang Elvira in I puritani at the Metropolitan Opera in January 2007, and on 30 May 2007, Netrebko made her Carnegie Hall debut with Dmitri Hvorostovsky and the Orchestra of St. Luke's, which was originally scheduled on 2 March 2006 but she postponed due to not feeling artistically ready. She then performed Donna Anna at Covent Garden, but withdrew from some performances due to illness. She appeared at the Last Night of the Proms on 8 September of that year where she performed excerpts from La sonnambula and Giuditta, and the lied "Morgen!" by Richard Strauss with Joshua Bell. In the fall of 2007 she reprised her role as Juliette in Roméo et Juliette at the Metropolitan Opera.

In December 2007 Netrebko was invited to honor Martin Scorsese at the 30th Annual Kennedy Center Honors, performing the aria "O mio babbino caro".

In January 2008 she performed Violetta at the Royal Opera House, Covent Garden to triumphant acclaim on the opening night, opposite Jonas Kaufmann and Dmitri Hvorostovsky in performances conducted by Maurizio Benini. However, she cancelled three subsequent performances due to suffering a bronchial condition. In May 2008, she made her Paris Opera debut in Bellini's I Capuleti e i Montecchi at the Opéra Bastille, with Joyce DiDonato as Romeo. In her first performance after her maternity leave, Netrebko sang Lucia in Lucia di Lammermoor when it opened at the Mariinsky Theatre in Saint Petersburg on 14 January 2009, in a production from the Scottish Opera led by John Doyle. She then sang the same role in January and February 2009 at the Metropolitan Opera. Netrebko appeared as Giulietta in I Capuleti e i Montecchi at the Royal Opera House in Spring 2009, and as Violetta in La traviata in June 2009 at the San Francisco Opera.

She presented the Deutscher Medienpreis 2009 to Chancellor Angela Merkel and sang Strauss' "Cäcilie" at the ceremony in Baden-Baden on 9 February 2010.

Through April and May 2010, she made a series of appearances at the Vienna State Opera in La bohème, Carmen, Manon. Originally scheduled in I puritani as well, she cancelled the appearance citing illness. She starred in Laurent Pelly's new Manon production at the Royal Opera, and sang Juliette at the Salzburg Festival. In October 2010, she returned to New York's Metropolitan Opera for Norina in Don Pasquale, the matinee performance on 13 November of which was broadcast nationwide by PBS.

Heavier roles (2011–2022)

On 2 April 2011, she sang the title role of Gaetano Donizetti's Anna Bolena at the Vienna State Opera for a sold-out premiere there, and the repeat performance on 5 April 2011 was broadcast live to cinemas around the world. On 7 December 2011, she opened the new season at La Scala in Milan, making her house debut, as Donna Anna in Don Giovanni. She has the distinction of being invited to appear in three consecutive opening night new productions at the Metropolitan Opera: Anna Bolena in 2011, L'elisir d'amore in 2012, and Eugene Onegin in 2013. Her performance as Lady Macbeth in the Metropolitan's 2014 fall season's production of Macbeth, a revival of Adrian Noble's 2007 production, drew critical praise and demonstrated her voice is still expanding in range and volume. She continued her expansion into heavier Verdi roles at the Met the following year, singing the role of Leonora in Il trovatore to acclaim from both critics and audiences.

She participated in the gala concert inaugurating the Mariinsky Theatre Second Stage on 2 May 2013. She was invited to perform the Olympic Anthem, in Russian, at the 2014 Winter Olympics opening ceremony.

In April 2016, Netrebko announced her withdrawal from productions of Bellini's Norma at the Royal Opera House's 2016/17 season and the Metropolitan Opera's 2017/18 season due to the change in her voice. The vacancies were filled respectively by Sonya Yoncheva and Sondra Radvanovsky.
She then made her debut as Elsa in Lohengrin at the Semperoper in Dresden, and then went to Saint Petersburg for the same role at the Mariinsky Theatre.

She made several role debuts in 2017, including the title role of Adriana Lecouvreur at Mariinsky Theatre in June, the title role of Aida at Salzburg Festival in August, and Maddalena in Andrea Chénier at La Scala in December. In 2018, she debuted as Tosca at the Metropolitan Opera in April and performed at the Summer Night Concert Schönbrunn on 31 May.

In 2018, she performed in both gala concerts at the Red Square on 13 June and at the Bolshoi Theatre on 14 July, respectively commemorating the opening and closing of the 2018 FIFA World Cup. On 8 September 2018 she took part in the inauguration gala concert of Zaryadye Concert Hall in Moscow, which was streamed on Medici.tv. In February 2019, she opened the 2019 Vienna Opera Ball. She was featured in the opening ceremony of 2019 European Games in Minsk on 21 June and inaugurated the first concert season of the Congress Hall at the Yekaterinburg Expo on 30 August 2019.

In June 2020 Netrebko performed highlights from Verdi's Don Carlo in reduced concert form at the Semperoper as part of its "Aufklang!" series which reopened the theatre after the first COVID-19 lockdown in Germany. She went on debuting at the Teatro di San Carlo in Naples for semi-staged Tosca with her husband and Ludovic Tézier. In September 2020 she had to self-isolate after her co-star in Don Carlo at the Bolshoi Theatre, Ildar Abdrazakov, was tested positive for COVID-19. She was soon hospitalised in Moscow, being treated for COVID-19-related pneumonia for about a week.

Boycott, March 2022 
On 26 February 2022, following the 2022 Russian invasion of Ukraine, Netrebko released a statement in which she voiced her opposition to the warfare but also expressed disagreement on forcing one to voice one's political opinion. Despite her statement, she faced pressure from performance institutions for failing to distance from Russian president Vladimir Putin. On 1 March 2022, she shared she would "retire from concert life until further notice". Immediately prior to her announcement, she withdrew from opera productions in Milan and Zürich, while the Bavarian State Opera cancelled existing engagements with both her and Valery Gergiev. Two days later, the Metropolitan Opera removed her from the upcoming Turandot, replacing her with the Ukrainian Liudmyla Monastyrska in the title role,    and from Don Carlos in the 2023 season. Berlin State Opera and Festspielhaus Baden-Baden also cancelled her appearances, with the latter not ruling out future cooperation. Finn McRedmond of The Irish Times  commented such "Wholesale boycott of Russia" would be "a dangerous departure from Western values", in reference to Netrebko's exclusion.

On 30 March 2022, Netrebko released another statement, where she announced plans to resume her public performances from May 2022, and repeated her condemnation of the war in Ukraine, distancing herself from Putin.

Netrebko was denounced as a traitor of the Russian State after her second statement on 30 March 2022. Her Russian performances were cancelled while a Duma deputy suggested that she resign from her Russian titles. Mathias Schulz later announced that he had been contacting Netrebko about performances scheduled in 2023.

In April, Netrebko appeared under a Ukrainian flag in Monte-Carlo  

In June 2022, Netrebko filed a labor grievance against the Met with the assistance of the American Guild of Musical Artists. 

In March 2023 it was annonced that the MET has been ordered to pay her the fees for the performances that the director P. Gelb undeservedly canceled.

Comeback on stage, May 2022 
In April 2022, Netrebko came back on stage in Monte-Carlo as Manon Lescaut, where she stepped in for the ailing Maria Agresta. She was unanimously praised for her performance, which was called "triumphant".

In May 2022, she received "triumphal" welcomes and ovations from audiences for her official comeback on stage in Philharmonie de Paris and Teatro alla Scala.

During summer 2022, she sang Aida (Verdi) and Turandot (Puccini) in Arena di Verona. She was praised by critics as "superlative" or "masterful" for the first one, and was acclaimed for her vocal and acting interpretations for the second one. Her name was applaused by the audience during the cast announcement. Between these performances, she sang some concerts, including in the program arias from Roméo et Juliette, Anna Bolena or The Queen of Spades, showing her vocal range.

In September 2022, she opened the season of the Wiener Staatsoper, singing Mimi in La Bohème. Around twenty people protested against her performance outside the opera and at her entrance, few protesters occupied the famous standing places, and booed her, while she was widely applauded by the rest of the audience. Critics praised her performance and stated that the booing was totally unjustified and ultimately covered by ovations at the end of the performance. The last performance of La bohème took place on her birthday and was broadcast on ORF3, press calling it another triumph.

Use of face-darkening makeup 
Netrebko has often performed the titular character in Aida, an Ethiopian princess, with face-darkening makeup, including her role debut at the Salzburg Festival in 2017, and at the Metropolitan Opera in 2018—despite the opera company's 2015 pledge to eliminate the use of face-darkening makeup in its productions. In June 2019 she defended such choice in the comments under her Instagram post for a performance.

In July 2022, Netrebko and the Arena di Verona Festival faced heavy criticism for performing in blackface, following the release of publicity photos for a performance of Aida. Subsequently, American soprano Angel Blue canceled her upcoming performances of La traviata at the Festival, citing the company's insistence on maintaining the practice. Blue's cancellation initiated heated discussion. Tenor Yusif Eyvazov, Netrebko's husband, called Blue's decision "disgusting,"  while mezzo-soprano Grace Bumbry offered a conciliatory perspective.

Other notable singers to have publicly spoken out against the use of blackface in Opera include the mezzo-soprano Jamie Barton who named Netrebko directly, and Stephanie Blythe, who suggested an abstention from performing operas that have typically featured white singers made up to appear as other ethnicities.

Responding to the controversy surrounding blackface, the Arena di Verona Festival claimed it is "very hard to change" the production to avoid the use of blackface (this staging dates from 2002). The Festival also stated that when Blue signed her contract for La traviata, this staging of Aida was already planned and she should already have known that blackface was to be used.

Other activities

Netrebko serves as an honorary director of the Russian Children's Welfare Society and has featured in several editions of "Petroushka Ball", the major fund raiser of the charity. In 2007, she was announced to be an ambassador for SOS Children's Villages in Austria, and a sponsor for the Tomilino village in Russia. She has been supporting the association "projekt Anna - Kinderhilfe Kaliningrad e.V." since 2005, and became its patron in 2008. In May 2012, she and her then-partner Erwin Schrott jointly founded the charitable foundation "Anna Netrebko and Erwin Schrott 4 Kids", aiming to promote education, art, culture and youth welfare.

Netrebko made a cameo appearance as herself in the 2004 film The Princess Diaries 2: Royal Engagement.

She has worn several designs by Austrian fashion designer Irina Vitjaz, who is a close friend of hers.

Political activity and relationship with Vladimir Putin 
As of 2022, there has been a debate over her association with Russian president Vladimir Putin. In 2012 she appeared on a list of 499 celebrities endorsing Putin in the 2012 Russian presidential election alongside Valery Gergiev and Denis Matsuev. She later explained this as a gesture of recognition of Putin´s support for the arts. After a blogger published that she also appeared on a declaration of support for Putin in 2018 she stated several times that she did not sign this declaration, that her name was kept from the 2012 list without her approval and that she did not even participate in the vote.

In 2011, she rejected claims that she and Putin had formerly been romantically involved, though she said "I'd have loved to have been ... he's a very attractive man. Such a strong, male energy."

In December 2014, she gave a ₽1,000,000 cheque to Oleg Tsaryov saying she was donating to the Donetsk Opera and Ballet Theatre, and posed alongside him with a flag of Novorossiya, a self-proclaimed confederation in Ukraine. Tsaryov is one of the individuals sanctioned by the European Union for his role in the 2014 pro-Russian unrest in Ukraine. Netrebko said in a statement, "I want to make clear, however, that this donation is not a political act."

Following the 2022 Russian invasion of Ukraine, Netrebko has held varying public stances. In late February, she said on social media that she opposed the invasion, but subsequently described people who forced her to express her political position as "human s***s" who "are as evil as blind aggressors." After her second statement on 30 March 2022, where she repeated her condemnation of the war in Ukraine, distancing herself from Putin, the Putin-controlled Russian Duma denounced her a traitor to her nation.

Since January 2023, she was among the public figures who was sanctioned by the Government of Ukraine.

Personal life

Citizenship
Netrebko applied for Austrian citizenship in Vienna in March 2006. In response to the backlash in her native country, she cited the cumbersome and humiliating process of obtaining visas as a Russian citizen for her many performances abroad as the main reason for the decision. In late July, the Council of Ministers approved the application for her "special merits", despite the fact that she neither spoke German nor lived in Austria.

Relationships

Netrebko started a relationship with Italian bass-baritone Simone Alberghini when they met during performances of Rigoletto at the Washington National Opera in 1999. She announced their engagement but did not consider marrying due to a busy schedule. In May 2007 their relationship was confirmed as ended.

In December 2007 Netrebko became engaged to Uruguayan bass-baritone Erwin Schrott, whom she first met during a collaboration in 2003. In April 2008, she announced their marriage, but their wedding never in fact took place. Their son, Tiago Aruã, was born on 5 September 2008 in Vienna. On 25 November 2013, the couple announced their separation, after several months of largely separate lives.

In February 2014, during rehearsals for a staging of Manon Lescaut in Rome, Netrebko began a relationship with Azerbaijani tenor , her co-star in that opera. Five months later, the couple announced their engagement. They married in Vienna on 29 December 2015. Their official wedding ceremony took place at the Palais Coburg, and the following celebration at the Gartenpalais Liechtenstein welcomed 180 guests in attendance, including Plácido Domingo.

Residence
Netrebko has apartments in Saint Petersburg, Vienna, and New York City. Since her pregnancy she had been looking for a new residence in Vienna. In 2008, she purchased and renovated a penthouse apartment at Franziskanerplatz. The renovation was not finished and she still lived in her original apartment by 2010. The building was evacuated in February 2010 due to acute danger of collapsing and only reopened two months later. In November 2009, she moved into a new apartment above Lincoln Square, Manhattan, where she combined two units for additional space.

Awards and recognition

In 2004, Netrebko was awarded the State Prize of the Russian Federation. She won 2006 Bambi Award in the classical music category.

Time magazine placed her on its Time 100 list in 2007. She won the 2007 Singer of the Year and the 2008 Female Artist of Year in the Classical Brit Awards. She was identified by the journal Musical America as "a genuine superstar for the 21st century" and was named Musician of the Year for 2008. In February 2008, she was named People's Artist of Russia. She was included in the list of Young Global Leaders 2010 issued by World Economic Forum. Netrebko was one of the recipients of Leading Ladies Award 2012 awarded by Madonna magazine. She received another Leading Ladies Award in the category of Culture in 2016. She was named one of the Beautiful People in 2013 by Paper. She was presented an Opera News Award in April 2016.

Netrebko won the "Female Singer of the Year" (Sängerin des Jahres) in the 2014 and 2016 Echo Klassik Award. She was awarded "Best Vocalist in Classical Music" at the Russian National Music Awards in 2016, 2017 and 2018. In February 2017, the Austrian government named her Kammersängerin. She won the Best Female Singer in the 2017 International Opera Awards. Asteroid 31104 Annanetrebko was named in her honor. The official naming citation was published by the Minor Planet Center on 31 January 2018. She was awarded the "World Star" of the BraVo International Professional Music Awards 2018. In May 2018, she received the Order of Friendship from the Azerbaijani president. On 26 October 2018, the Metropolitan Opera Guild honored her on its annual luncheon. In 2020 she was awarded the Swedish Polar Music Prize and the Victoire d'honneur in the Victoires de la musique classique. 

On 18th September of 2021, Netrebko celebrated her 50th birthday with a concert held in the Kremlin in Moscow. The concert featured friends and stars as Eyvazov, Rolando Villazon, Placido Domingo or Michael Volle. Putin congratulated from afar through Dmitri Peskov, because he had been exposed to Corona cases.  Part of the proceeds from ticket sales will be donated to the Arithmetic of Good charity fund, which helps orphans. 

In September 2022, she received an "Österreichischer Musiktheaterpreis" as Best Female Leading Role for her portrayal of Lady Macbeth in “Macbeth” in Wiener Staatsoper.

Recordings

Opera roles

 Susanna, Le nozze di Figaro (Mozart)
 Königin der Nacht, Die Zauberflöte (Mozart)
 Lyudmila, Ruslan and Lyudmila (Glinka)
 Pamina, Die Zauberflöte (Mozart)
 Rosina, Il barbiere di Siviglia (Rossini)
 Adina, L'elisir d'amore (Donizetti)
 Micaëla, Carmen (Bizet)
 Flower Maiden, Parsifal (Wagner)
 Louisa, Betrothal in a Monastery (Prokofiev)
 Xenia, Boris Godunov (Mussorgsky)
 Ninetta, The Love for Three Oranges (Prokofiev)
 Violetta, La traviata (Verdi)
 Amina, La sonnambula (Bellini)
 Teresa, Benvenuto Cellini (Berlioz)
 Gilda, Rigoletto (Verdi)
 Ilia, Idomeneo (Mozart)
 Musetta, La bohème (Puccini)
 Natasha, War and Peace (Prokofiev)
 Lucia, Lucia di Lammermoor (Donizetti)
 Zerlina, Don Giovanni (Mozart)
 Marfa, The Tsar's Bride (Rimsky-Korsakov)
 Antonia, Les contes d'Hoffmann (Offenbach)
 Giulietta, I Capuleti e i Montecchi (Bellini)
 Donna Anna, Don Giovanni (Mozart)
 Servilia, La clemenza di Tito (Mozart)
 Juliette, Roméo et Juliette (Gounod)
 Mimì, La bohème (Puccini)
 Norina, Don Pasquale (Donizetti)
 Manon Lescaut, Manon (Massenet)
 Elvira, I puritani (Bellini)
 Iolanta, Iolanta (Tchaikovsky)
 Anna Bolena, Anna Bolena (Donizetti)
 Tatiana, Eugene Onegin (Tchaikovsky)
 Giovanna, Giovanna d'Arco (Verdi)
 Leonora, Il trovatore (Verdi)
 Manon Lescaut, Manon Lescaut (Puccini)
 Lady Macbeth, Macbeth (Verdi)
 Sylva Varescu, Die Csárdásfürstin (Kálmán)
 Elsa, Lohengrin (Wagner)
 Adriana Lecouvreur, Adriana Lecouvreur (Cilea)
 Maddalena de Coigny, Andrea Chénier (Giordano)
 Aida, Aida (Verdi)
 Floria Tosca, Tosca (Puccini)
 Leonora, La forza del destino (Verdi)
 Turandot, Turandot (Puccini)
 Elisabetta, Don Carlos (Verdi)

References

See also
Teodor Currentzis, Russian Greek conductor

External links 

 
 Reviews, articles, photos and future schedules for Anna Netrebko from The Opera Critic
 Profile of Netrebko, The New York Times
 Interview with Anna Netrebko on Opera Lively
 
 Interview with Anna Netrebko, Stephen Costello, Peter Gelb on Anna Bolena, Charlie Rose, 10 October 2011

1971 births
Living people
People from Krasnodar
People's Artists of Russia
Russian operatic sopranos
Österreichischer Kammersänger
Saint Petersburg Conservatory alumni
State Prize of the Russian Federation laureates
Naturalised citizens of Austria
Russian emigrants to Austria
Deutsche Grammophon artists
20th-century Russian women opera singers
21st-century Russian women opera singers
Russian National Music Award winners
Russian people of Ukrainian descent
Recipients of the Bambi (prize)
Recipients of the Golden Mask
Winners of the Golden Gramophone Award
Sanctioned due to Russo-Ukrainian War